During the 1985–86 English football season, Brentford competed in the Football League Third Division. Inferior home form and a number of key player departures meant that the Bees could finish no higher than 10th position.

Season summary 

After the recent Heysel Stadium disaster and the Bradford City stadium fire, the financial implications of the work needed to bring Griffin Park up to standard hampered Brentford manager Frank McLintock's movement in the transfer market during the 1985 off-season. The core of the previous season's Football League Trophy final team would be sold off, with midfielder Chris Kamara and forward Keith Cassells leaving before the beginning of the season and captain Terry Hurlock would later be sold for a club-record £95,000 fee in February 1986. Goalkeeper Trevor Swinburne and defender Paul Roberts were released and the mid-season retirement of goalscoring winger Gary Roberts also compounded the break-up of the team. McLintock re-signed bit-part goalkeeper Richard Key and midfielder Terry Bullivant on free transfers and also brought in 20-year-old centre back Terry Evans from non-league Hillingdon, a transfer which would go on to be an important contributor the club's success in the early 1990s.

The 1985–86 season proved to be one of consolidation in the Third Division for Brentford, with the team briefly challenging for promotion in August and for a three-month period in late 1985, but otherwise being rooted in mid-table. There was little cheer to be had in the cup competitions, but manager Frank McLintock was able to make some incoming mid-season transfers, bringing in midfielder Andy Sinton for a £25,000 fee and loaning wingers Steve Burke and Ian Holloway from Queens Park Rangers and Wimbledon respectively. Forward Francis Joseph, top scorer during the 1982–83 season, returned from a long injury layoff in April 1986 and boosting the attack, which had been led alone by Robbie Cooke. Brentford finished the season in 10th place, with an away record superior to that of at Griffin Park.

League table

Results
Brentford's goal tally listed first.

Legend

Pre-season and friendlies

Football League Third Division

FA Cup

Football League Cup

Football League Trophy 

 Sources: 100 Years of Brentford, The Big Brentford Book of the Eighties, Statto

Playing squad 
Players' ages are as of the opening day of the 1985–86 season.

 Sources: The Big Brentford Book of the Eighties, Timeless Bees

Coaching staff

Statistics

Appearances and goals
Substitute appearances in brackets.

Players listed in italics left the club mid-season.
Source: The Big Brentford Book of the Eighties

Goalscorers 

Players listed in italics left the club mid-season.
Source: The Big Brentford Book of the Eighties

Management

Summary

Transfers & loans

Awards 
 Supporters' Player of the Year: Gary Phillips
 Players' Player of the Year: Gary Phillips

References 

Brentford F.C. seasons
Brentford
Brentford F.C.